Ray Ashton (born 26 October 1960) is an English former professional rugby league footballer and coach who played as a  or . He started his career at Oldham and went on to play for Leeds before finishing his career at Workington Town and Bramley as a player-coach. He was also selected for the 1984 Great Britain Lions tour.

Playing career

Oldham
Ashton started his professional career at Oldham, signing from Widnes Tigers in 1979. He made his debut on 16 September 1979 in the John Player Trophy against Leeds.

While at Oldham, he was selected to play on the 1984 Great Britain Lions tour, but did not feature in any Test matches.

Leeds
In January 1987, Ashton was signed by Leeds for a fee of around £40,000. He played in the 1987–88 John Player Special Trophy final for Leeds, losing 14–15 to St Helens.

He was part of the team which won the 1988–89 Yorkshire Cup, defeating Castleford 33–12 in the final at Elland Road.

Coaching career
In July 1990, Ashton was appointed as player-coach at Workington Town. In September 1991, he coached Lancashire in the War of the Roses against Yorkshire. He was sacked by Workington in December 1991.

In September 1993, he was appointed in a player-coaching role by Bramley.

References

1960 births
Living people
English rugby league players
Rugby league players from Widnes
Rugby league halfbacks
Oldham R.L.F.C. players
Leeds Rhinos players
Workington Town players
Bramley RLFC players
Workington Town coaches
Bramley R.L.F.C. coaches